Delta Blues (In a Land of Cotton) is a 2001 documentary film. The movie deals with the environmental problems emanating from the drying up of the Aral Sea, and the impact this has on political relationships in the Central Asian region (especially Uzbekistan, Kazakhstan, Kyrgyzstan, and Turkmenistan). In particular, it focuses on the document Water-related vision for the Aral Sea basin for the year 2025 by UNESCO, as presented in 2000 at the 2nd World Water Forum in The Hague. This document has been criticized for setting unrealistic goals, and also, by focusing on the entire basin (south-west Kazakhstan, Uzbekistan, Turkmenistan), for implicitly giving up on the Aral Sea and the people living downstream in Karakalpakstan.

Summary 

The cause of the drying up of the Aral Sea is the extensive irrigation, used for the production of (mainly) cotton. Apart from cotton being a thirsty crop, the irrigation canals are very inefficient and much water is wasted. Furthermore, the water that is returned to the rivers is highly polluted (with pesticides and fertilizers). There is however no incentive to change the irresponsible use of water in the region. Water is an externality, regarded as given by nature or God. This leads to a situation where those (countries, regions or farms) who use most of the available water, benefit the most, but do not pay for it, leaving others (living downstream) with less and polluted water.

Whereas in most debates about accountability for water use, privatization is seen as the enemy of the people dependent on the water, many NGOs in this (former Soviet) region claim instead that the source of the water-related problems lies in the irresponsible use of water, mainly by the agricultural sector (which is still predominantly owned by the state). Many claim that this can only be changed by changing the soviet paradigm, namely by putting a price tag on water: the more water one uses and/or pollutes, the more one should pay.

Interviewees 

 Oral Ataniyazova (foundation Perzent, Nukus)
 Yusup Kamalov (Union for Defence of the Aral Sea and Amudarya river (UDASA), Nukus)
 Meryem Aslan (Oxfam Novib, The Hague)
 Max Spoor (Institute of Social Studies, The Hague)
 Ian Small (Médecins Sans Frontières, Nukus)
 Scott O'Connor (Central Asia Free Exchange (CAFE), Nukus)
 Sagitzjan Aitzjanov  (Central Asia Free Exchange, Muynak)
 Frits Verhoog (UNESCO, Paris)
 Rashid Koshekov (Ministry of Water, Karakalpakstan)
 Bakhtiyar Zhollybekov / Jollibekov (Tashkent Agrarian University, Nukus)

See also 

 Water privatization
 Externality
 Soviet Union
 Central Asia
 Karakalpakstan

References

External links 
 Official site of the documentary film Delta Blues
 Trailer of the documentary film Delta Blues
 UNESCO's Water-related vision for the Aral Sea basin for the year 2025, as presented in March 2000 at the 2nd World Water Forum in The Hague
 Article on UNESCO's Water Related Vision for the Aral Sea Basin

Environmental issues with water
Documentary films about water and the environment
Central Asia